Gobustan Rock Art represents flora and fauna, hunting, lifestyles, and culture of pre-historic and medieval periods of time. The carvings on the rocks illustrates primitive men, ritual dances, men with lances in their hands, animals, bull fights, camel caravans, and pictures of the sun and stars. The date of these carvings goes back to 5.000 – 20.000 years before present.

Gobustan Rock Art Cultural Landscape
The Gobustan Rock Art Cultural Landscape represents the history of humanity from the Upper Paleolithic era to the Middle Ages in Eurasia. The area of the site is 537 ha.

The cultural landscape covers three rocky highlands in the semi-desert territory of central Azerbaijan. There are more than 6.000 rock engravings on more than 1.000 surfaces of rocks that reflects 40.000 years of history of rock art.

During the archaeological excavation, 104 small-sized engraved stones were also discovered at different archaeological stages

Petroglyphs in Gobustan dating about 5,000 to 8,000 years back contain longships similar to Viking ships. The discovery of ship illustrations among the rock paintings in Gobustan shows its relationship with the Mediterranean and the European continent.

Jingirdag, Boyukdash, and Kichikdash mountains and Yazili hill are located in Gobustan, which are the home for the ancient rock art. Most of the rock carving can be found on the upper surface of Boyukdash and Kicikdash mountains. The paintings on the rock walls date back to 3-4 thousand years ago mainly reflect hunting scenes. Human (dancers, hunters, men wearing tropical helmets) and animal (deer and goat) paintings are depicted on the rocks of more sheltered sides.

Images of animals on Gobustan rocks vary depending on the periods because of the change in the hunting targets (from big animals like aurochs and wild horses (during the Pleistocene period) to relatively smaller Holocene animals such as deer, wild boar and bird) according to the climate change starting at the beginning of the Holocene period.

The petroglyphs on the walls of the living sites as “Firuz-1”, “Firuz-2”, “Gaya-arasi”, “Gaya-Arasi-2” on Kicikdash Mountain, “Kaniza”, “Ana-Zaga” on Boyukdash Mountain are similar to the petroglyphs on some stones in this site.

One of the rocks has a Latin inscription belonging to the period of Roman Emperor Domitian’s reign (81-96 AD), which shows the temporary stay of the 12th Roman Legion led by Fulminate on the Caspian shores.

Another remnant of the early time is so-called "gaval chalan dash" (tambourine stone), an ancient musical instrument described in Gobustan Rock Art.

In 1996, by the decree of the Council of Ministers of Azerbaijan SSR, the mountains were declared as Gobustan State Historical Artistic Preserve. By the decree of the president, the mountains were declared as National Reserve in 2007.

For its quality and density of rock art engravings, Gobustan was declared as a UNESCO World Heritage Site in 2007.

History
The cultural landscape was firstly discovered by local miner in 1939–40. The sticky drawings of the deer, goat and cattle dated between 12th and 8th centuries BC reflect the Neolithic period in Gobustan. Gobustan petroglyphs studied by Isak Jafarzadeh who analyzed approximately 750 rocks with more than 3.500 petroglyphs in 1947 and onwards were divided into 6 periods from ancient times to the Middle Ages:

 Neolithic period (figures contain men and women drawings with arrow and bow on  their shoulders), 
 Late Neolithic period (drawings of bison, boat, and archers), 
 Eneolithic period (big drawings of goats, lions and deer), 
 Bronze Age period (wild animals, horses and pigs drawings), 
 Iron Age period (man drawings, goats and deer figures, as well as Roman inscriptions)

The Middle Ages (camel caravans drawings, a warrior with a weapon on his hand, symbols, Arabic and Persian inscriptions).

Later on, F. Muradova and J. Rustamov made new discoveries of more than 1.500 images. During the archaeological excavation, numerous Bronze Age structures were found here. Those archaeological excavations were supported by the Institute of Archeological and Ethnography of the National Academy of Science of Azerbaijan.

In 1966, 1988 and 2001, all discoveries of rock carvings and images were taken under state protection.

Gallery

See also
 Gobustan District
 Gobustan National Park
 World Heritage Site

References

External links
 World Heritage List
 Gobustan Rock Art Cultural Landscape UNESCO collection on Google Arts and Culture

World Heritage Sites in Azerbaijan
Archaeological sites in Azerbaijan
Gobustan District
Rock art
Art venues